Ghost Town is a 1956 American Western film directed by Allen H. Miner and written by Jameson Brewer. The film stars Kent Taylor, John Smith, Marian Carr, Serena Sande and John Doucette. The film was released in March 1956 by United Artists.

Plot
Four passengers in a stagecoach are heading west through Indian territory: Barbara, a young woman going to meet her fiancée; Rev. Wheedle, a minister who believes the settlers should make friends with the Indians; Doc, a drunken doctor; and Conroy, a well-dressed “gentleman” with a sly and cynical tone.

At a stage stop that has been destroyed by Indians, they are joined by Duff, the woman’s fiancé and his friend Crusty; they have been prospecting for gold for the last two years. They continue on, then encounter Sgt. Dockery, a soldier from a nearby fort, and Alex, his son. The soldier tells the group that the Cheyenne are on the warpath and they have to change course. The group is then attacked by a band of Cheyenne and the two stagecoach drivers are killed. The doctor is also killed. The rest of the group manages to get to a ghost town (apparently wiped out by a disease of some kind), where they hold up for the night. They are joined there by Stone Knife, a disgraced Cheyenne chief, and Maureen, his young half-white female companion.

The Cheyanne attack and the group is able to hold them off, but they run out of ammunition. The minister tries to go and talk to the Cheyenne, but is killed. The Army sergeant’s son sneaks off in the night to try and get help, but is also seemingly killed. The next day Fire Knife, the leader of Cheyanne, offers the group a bargain – turn over Stone Knife, and the rest will be allowed to go free. Duff, who has become the leader of the group, doesn’t want to do it, but Stone Knife sneaks out a back door and gives himself up, so the rest are allowed to leave the ghost town.

Cast 
Kent Taylor as Conroy
John Smith as Duff
William 'Bill' Phillips as Kerry 'Crusty' McCabe (uncredited)
Marian Carr as Barbara
Serena Sande as Maureen
John Doucette as Doc
Joel Ashley as Sgt. Dockery
Gilman Rankin as Rev. Wheedle
Gary Murray as Alex Dockery
Edmund Hashim as Stone Knife
Chief Ted Nez as Fire Knife

Production
Parts of the film were shot in Johnson Canyon and the Kanab movie fort in Utah.

References

External links 
 

1956 films
1956 Western (genre) films
American Western (genre) films
Films set in ghost towns
United Artists films
Films shot in Utah
Films scored by Paul Dunlap
1950s English-language films
1950s American films
American black-and-white films